Kicha Poonphol (born 27 May 1936) is a Thai boxer. He competed in the men's flyweight event at the 1960 Summer Olympics. At the 1960 Summer Olympics, he lost to Paul Chervet of Switzerland.

References

External links
 

1936 births
Living people
Kicha Poonphol
Kicha Poonphol
Boxers at the 1960 Summer Olympics
Kicha Poonphol
Flyweight boxers